Les Penning is a British folk musician and composer, best known for his work with Mike Oldfield on the album Ommadawn and several of Oldfield's singles. He is credited with introducing Oldfield to medieval music through their time playing together at Penrhos Court. He has worked with many other artists, playing woodwind, as producer or as recording engineer, and has created radio drama for BBC Hereford and Worcester and music for two S4C television series: Gwyddion and an adaption by Gareth Miles of the William John Griffith novel Storïau'r Henllys Fawr.In 1978 he was a musician and performer on the BBC adaption of ‘Kilvert’s Diary’

In 1977 he was given the title of Sir Les Penning, Master of the King's music, to Richard Booth, the King of Hay. He has recently worked in on several projects in collaboration with Robert Reed including "Doctor Who Theme" and "Sanctuary II" and his albums "Belerion", "Return to Penrhos and "The Ringmaster Part One and Two".

Discography
Albums
The Worldes Goodnyte (2007)
Througham Slad's Lost Sessions (2014) with Mike Oldfield (unofficial release)
Belerion (2016) with Robert Reed, Phil Bates, and Miguel Engel de la LLave Jiménez
Return to Penhros (2019) with Robert Reed and Tom Newman

Singles and EPs
Cuckoo Song (instrumental) with Mike Oldfield, Virgin, 1977 	
The British Grenadiers, Polydor Records, 1977
The Hay 'National Anthem', Hay Gramophone Gesellschaft, 1977
Should Have Been Forever, Plant Life Records, 1983 		
Willow Fair, Plant Life Records, 1983 		
Sussex Carol (with Rob Reed), 2016
In Dulci Jubilo  (with Rob Reed), 2018
The Floral Dance (with Rob Reed), 2019 with Robert Reed

As a contributing artist
Ommadawn, Virgin Records, 1975 – Recorder, Conductor 
In Dulci Jubilo, Virgin, 1975
Portsmouth, Virgin, 1976 – Recorders and feet
Argiers, Virgin, 1976
Echo & the Bunnymen, Heaven Up Here, 1981
Harmony Revival, Original Copy (LP), Ellie Jay Records, 1981
Robert Reed, Sanctuary III (LP, Album), Plane Groovy, 2018
Theme from Dr Who (with Robert Reed and Tom Newman), 2018
Ryan Yard, Going Home, 2018
Rob Reed,Tubular Bells - A Minor Tune (2019) with Robert Reed and Tom Newman

Other music industry work
Mean Street Dealers, Bent Needles Recording Engineer, 1980

Somerville Gentleman’s Band, Far From Home  Recording Engineer and recorder on "Upton Stick Dance", 1980

Manyana, Live Carrots  Recording Engineer, 1980

Diamond Head, Diamond Lights EP – Engineer, 1981

Harmony Revival, Original Copy LP – Recording Engineer, 1981

Carolyn Robson, Banks of Tyne  Recording Engineer, 1981

Regal Slip, Bandstand Recording Engineer, 1981

The Forbury Consort, 12th - 20th century Cassette – Recording Engineer, 1991

Esther Davies, With all of my Heart LP – Recording Engineer, 1995

Matthew Smith, Matthew Smith LP – Recording Engineer, 1995

References

External links
 Official Facebook Page

  as Les
  as Leslie
With Miguel Engel de la LLave Jiménez

British folk singers
British composers
British multi-instrumentalists
1944 births
Living people